Byerastavitsa District is an administrative subdivision, a raion of Grodno Region, in Belarus.

The Byerastavitsa District was founded from Polish areas annexed by the Soviet Union on January 15, 1940, as the Krynki Raion; in 1944, it was renamed to current name. 
Its capital city is Vyalikaya Byerastavitsa.

Notable residents 
 Andrzej Poczobut (born 1973, Vyalikaya Byerastavitsa), Belarusian and Polish journalist and activist, political prisoner

References

 
Districts of Grodno Region